The Association for Art History (AAH) (formerly Association of Art Historians) promotes the professional practice and public understanding of art history. It was formed in 1974, is based in London, England, and is a registered charity (No. 1154066).

Membership
Individual membership is open to anyone with a professional commitment to and interest in art history and visual culture. Institutional membership is also available.

Members can get involved in the following interest groups:

Freelance and independents
Higher and further education 
Schools
Students
Museums & exhibitions.

Governance and financial
The Association is governed by a Board of Trustees. For the year ended 31 December 2010, the AAH had a gross income of £396,818 and expenditure of £359,507 according to accounts filed with the Charity Commission.

Publications
There is a quarterly newsletter, the Bulletin, and a scholarly journal Art History published five times a year in association with Wiley-Blackwell, which is peer-reviewed.

Events
Regular events take place, often organised by volunteers from the various member interest groups, together with an annual conference.

Affiliations
The AAH is affiliated with the US College Art Association (CAA) and supports the Comité International d'Histoire de l'Art (CIHA).

References

External links
AAH official website 
AAH Annual Conference Programme Archive (PDF)
Charity Commission page about the AAH including historic financial information

Arts organizations established in 1974
1974 establishments in England
Academic organisations based in the United Kingdom
Charities based in London
Arts organisations based in the United Kingdom
Art history